Prümer Urbar, better known in English as the Polyptych or Polyptychon of Prüm, is a register of the properties (Urbarium) that belonged to the Benedictine Prüm Abbey in the Eifel in the year 893. In this document, the numerous possessions of the abbey were recorded.

The date of the original nomenclature's creation - written by Abbot Regino of Prüm - is not known. In 1222, Caesarius of Milendonk produced the only surviving copy of the Prüm Urbar, adding additional information and comments. This document stretches 57 pages and 118 chapters.

References

Further reading
 Y. Morimoto, 'Aspects of the early medieval peasant economy as revealed in the polyptych of Prüm', in J. Nelson and P. Linehan, The Medieval World (2003), pp. 605-620
 Partial English translation: https://www.le.ac.uk/hi/polyptyques/prum/site.html 

9th-century documents
9th century in Germany
893
Eifel in the Middle Ages